The men's pommel horse competition at the 1936 Summer Olympics was held at the Waldbühne on 10 and 11 August. It was the sixth appearance of the event. There were 110 competitors from 14 nations, with each nation sending a team of up to 8 men. The event was won by Konrad Frey of Germany, the nation's first victory in the event and first medal since 1896. Switzerland earned the other two medals, with Eugen Mack getting silver and Albert Bachmann receiving bronze.

Background

This was the sixth appearance of the event, which is one of the five apparatus events held every time there were apparatus events at the Summer Olympics (no apparatus events were held in 1900, 1908, 1912, or 1920). Four of the 10 gymnasts from 1932 returned: gold medalist István Pelle of Hungary, bronze medalist Frank Haubold of the United States, fourth-place finisher Frank Cumiskey of the United States, sixth-place finisher Al Jochim of the United States, seventh-place finisher Heikki Savolainen of Finland, eighth-place finisher Ilmari Pakarinen of Finland, and ninth-place finisher Mauri Nyberg-Noroma of Finland. Eugen Mack of Switzerland was the reigning (1934) world champion and a favorite in the event.

Austria, Japan, and Romania each made their debut in the men's pommel horse. The United States made its fifth appearance, most of any nation, having missed only the inaugural 1896 Games.

Competition format

The gymnastics format returned to the aggregation format used in 1928 but not in 1932. Each nation entered a team of eight gymnasts (Bulgaria had only 7). All entrants in the gymnastics competitions (Erang of Luxembourg did not compete in the pommel horse) performed both a compulsory exercise and a voluntary exercise, with the scores summed to give a final total. The scores in the pommel horse were added to the other apparatus scores to give individual all-around scores; the top six individual scores on each team were summed to give a team all-around score. No separate finals were contested.

The compulsory exercise was described in the Official Report:

Schedule

Results

References

Men's pommel horse
1936
Men's 1936
Men's events at the 1936 Summer Olympics